Louis "Lou" Silvers (né Louis Silberstein; September 6, 1889 – March 26, 1954) was an American film score composer whose work has been used in more than 250 movies. In 1935, he won the first Academy Award for Best Original Score for One Night of Love.

Early life
Silvers was born in New York City.

Career
Silvers scored the sound sequences in the D. W. Griffith film Dream Street (1921), and scored the part-talking feature film The Jazz Singer (1927). He was also music director for Lux Radio Theater for most of its long run (1934–1955). 

He is the composer of the song "April Showers" (1921).

Personal life and death
Silvers was married to Janet Adair. On March 26, 1954, Silvers died of a heart ailment in Hollywood, California.

Awards and nominations

Selected filmography
 Sonny Boy (1929)
 No Greater Glory (1934)
 The Girl Friend (1935)
 A Message to Garcia (1936)
 Private Number (1936)

Bibliography

Notes

References

  ; .

 
 

  ; ; .

 

 

  ; .

External links

 
 

1889 births
1954 deaths
20th-century American composers
20th-century American male musicians
American film score composers
American male film score composers
Best Original Music Score Academy Award winners
Burials at Forest Lawn Memorial Park (Glendale)
Composers from New York City
Musicians from New York City